Semenovo is a rural locality (a village) in Biryakovskoye Rural Settlement, Sokolsky District, Vologda Oblast, Russia. The population was 19 as of 2002.

Geography 
Semenovo is located 97 km northeast of Sokol (the district's administrative centre) by road. Seleznevo is the nearest rural locality.

References 

Rural localities in Sokolsky District, Vologda Oblast